Kanding Township is a rural township in Pingtung County, Taiwan.

Geography

Administrative divisions
The township comprises eight villages: Beishi, Gangtung, Kanding, Lishe, Weinei, Yuanliao, Yuexi and Zhouzi.

Transportation
 TRA Kanding Station

References

External links

 Kanding Township Office 

Townships in Pingtung County